Kama (Sanskrit: काम) means "desire, wish, longing" in Hindu, Buddhist, Jain, and Sikh literature. Kama often connotes sensual pleasure, sexual desire, and longing both in religious and secular Hindu and Buddhist literature, as well as contemporary Indian literature, but the concept more broadly refers to any desire, wish, passion, longing, pleasure of the senses, desire for, longing to and after, the aesthetic enjoyment of life, affection, or love, enjoyment of love is particularly with or without enjoyment of sexual, sensual and erotic desire, and may be without sexual connotations.

Kama is one of the four goals of human life and is also contemplated as one of the primary needs to fulfill during the stages of life according to the Hindu tradition. It is considered an essential and healthy goal of human life when pursued without sacrificing the other three goals: Dharma (virtuous, proper, moral life), Artha (material prosperity, income security, means of life) and Moksha (liberation, release, self-actualization). Together, these four aims of life are called Puruṣārtha.

Definition and meaning
Kama means "desire, wish, or longing". In contemporary Indian literature, kama refers usually to sensual pleasure and sexual desire. However, the term also refers to any sensory enjoyment, emotional attraction and aesthetic pleasure such as from arts, dance, music, painting, sculpture, and nature.

The concept kama is found in some of the earliest known verses in the Vedas. For example, Book 10 of the Rig Veda describes the creation of the universe from nothing by the great heat. There in hymn 129, it states:

The Brihadaranyaka Upanishad, one of the oldest Upanishads of Hinduism, uses the term kama, also in a broader sense, to refer to any desire:

Ancient Indian literature such as the Epics, which followed the Upanishads, develop and explain the concept of kama together with Artha and Dharma. The Mahabharata, for example, provides one of the expansive definitions of kama. The Epic claims kama to be any agreeable and desirable experience (pleasure) generated by the interaction of one or more of the five senses with anything congenial to that sense and while the mind is concurrently in harmony with the other goals of human life (dharma, artha and moksha).

Kama often implies the short form of the word kamana (desire, appetition or appetite). Kama, however, is more than kamana. Kama is an experience that includes the discovery of an object, learning about the object, emotional connection, the process of enjoyment and the resulting feeling of well-being before, during, and after the experience.

Vatsyayana, the author of the Kamasutra, describes kama as happiness that is a manasa vyapara (phenomenon of the mind). Just like the Mahabharata, Vatsyayana's Kamasutra defines kama as pleasure an individual experiences from the world, with one or more senses: hearing, seeing, tasting, smelling, and feeling—in harmony with one's mind and soul. Experiencing harmonious music is kama, as is being inspired by natural beauty, the aesthetic appreciation of a work of art, and admiring with joy something created by another human being. Kama Sutra, in its discourse on kama, describes many forms of art, dance, and music, along with sex, as the means to pleasure and enjoyment. Pleasure enhances one's appreciation of incense, candles, music, scented oil, yoga stretching and meditation, and the experience of the heart chakra. Negativity, doubt and hesitation block the heart chakra, openness is impaired while attached to desires. Kamala in the heart chakra, is considered to be a seat of devotional worship. Opening the heart chakra is awareness of a divine communion and joy for communion with deities and the self (atman).

John Lochtefeld explains kama as desire, noting that it often refers to sexual desire in contemporary literature, but in ancient Indian literature kāma includes any kind of attraction and pleasure such as those deriving from the arts.

Karl Potter describes kama as an attitude and capacity. A little girl who hugs her teddy bear with a smile is experiencing kama, as are two lovers in embrace. During these experiences, the person connects and identifies the beloved as part of oneself and feels more complete, fulfilled, and whole by experiencing that connection and nearness. This, in the Indian perspective, is kāma.

Hindery notes the inconsistent and diverse expositions of kama in various ancient texts of India. Some texts, such as the Epic Ramayana, paint kama through the desire of Rama for Sita — a desire that transcends the physical and marital into a love that is spiritual, and something that gives Rama his meaning of life, his reason to live. Sita and Rama both frequently express their unwillingness and inability to live without the other. This romantic and spiritual view of kama in the Ramayana by Valmiki is quite different, claim Hindery and others, than the normative and dry description of kama in the law codes of smriti by Manu for example.

Gavin Flood explains kama as "love" without violating dharma (moral responsibility), artha (material prosperity) and one's journey towards moksha (spiritual liberation).

In Hinduism
In Hinduism, kama is regarded as one of the four proper and necessary goals of human life (purusharthas), the others being Dharma (virtuous, proper, moral life), Artha (material prosperity, income security, means of life) and Moksha (liberation, release, self-actualization).

Relative precedence among artha and dharma
Ancient Indian literature emphasizes that dharma precedes and is essential. If dharma is ignored, artha and kama lead to social chaos.

Vatsyayana in Kama Sutra recognizes relative value of three goals as follows: artha precedes kama, while dharma precedes both kama and artha. Vatsyayana, in Chapter 2 of Kama Sutra, presents a series of philosophical objections argued against kama and then offers his answers to refute those objections. For example, one objection to kama (pleasure, enjoyment), acknowledges Vatsyayana, is this concern that kāma is an obstacle to moral and ethical life, to religious pursuits, to hard work, and to productive pursuit of prosperity and wealth. The pursuit of pleasure, claim objectors, encourages individuals to commit unrighteous deeds, bring distress, carelessness, levity and suffering later in life. These objections were then answered by Vatsyayana, with the declaration that kama is as necessary to human beings as food, and kama is holistic with dharma and artha.

Necessity for existence
Just like good food is necessary for the well being of the body, good pleasure is necessary for the healthy existence of a human being, suggests Vatsyayana. A life devoid of pleasure and enjoyment—sexual, artistic, of nature—is hollow and empty. Just like no one should stop farming crops even though everyone knows herds of deer exist and will try to eat the crop as it grows up, in the same way claims Vatsyayana, one should not stop one's pursuit of kama because dangers exist. Kama should be followed with thought, care, caution and enthusiasm, just like farming or any other life pursuit.

Vatsyayana's book the Kama Sutra, in parts of the world, is presumed or depicted as a synonym for creative sexual positions; in reality, only 20% of Kama Sutra is about sexual positions. The majority of the book, notes Jacob Levy, is about the philosophy and theory of love, what triggers desire, what sustains it, how and when it is good or bad. Kama Sutra presents kama as an essential and joyful aspect of human existence.

Holistic

Vatsyayana claims kama is never in conflict with dharma or artha, rather all three coexist and kama results from the other two.

In Hindu philosophy, pleasure in general, and sexual pleasure in particular, is neither shameful nor dirty. It is necessary for human life, essential for well being of every individual, and wholesome when pursued with due consideration of dharma and artha. Unlike the precepts of some religions, kama is celebrated in Hinduism, as a value in its own right. Together with artha and dharma, it is an aspect of a holistic life. All three purusharthas—Dharma, Artha and Kama—are equally and simultaneously important.

Stages of life
Some ancient Indian literature observe that the relative precedence of artha, kama and dharma are naturally different for different people and different age groups. In a baby or child, education and kāma (artistic desires) take precedence; in youth kāma and artha take precedence; while in old age dharma takes precedence.

Deity
Kama is deified as Kamadeva and his consort Rati. Deity Kama is comparable to the Greek deity Eros—they both trigger human sexual attraction and sensual desire. Kama rides a parrot, and the deity is armed with bow and arrows to pierce hearts. The bow is made of sugarcane stalk, the bowstring is a line of bees, and the arrows are tipped with five flowers representing five emotions-driven love states. The five flowers on Kama arrows are lotus flower (infatuation), ashoka flower (intoxication with thoughts about the other person), mango flower (exhaustion and emptiness in absence of the other), jasmine flower (pining for the other) and blue lotus flower (paralysis with confusion and feelings). These five arrows also have names, the last and most dangerous of which is Sammohanam, infatuation.

Kama is also known as Ananga (literally "one without body") because desire strikes formlessly, through feelings in unseen ways. The other names for deity Kama include Madan (he who intoxicates with love), Manmatha (he who agitates the mind), Pradyumna (he who conquers all) and Kushumesu (he whose arrows are flowers).

In Buddhism
(See also Buddhism and sexuality)

In the Buddhist Pali Canon, Gautama Buddha renounced (Pali: nekkhamma) sensuality (kama) as a route to Enlightenment. Some Buddhist lay practitioners recite daily the Five Precepts, a commitment to abstain from "sexual misconduct" (kāmesu micchacara กาเมสุ มิจฺฉาจารา). Typical of Pali Canon discourses, the Dhammika Sutta (Sn 2.14) includes a more explicit correlate to this precept when the Buddha enjoins a follower to "observe celibacy or at least do not have sex with another's wife."

Theosophy
In the Theosophy of Blavatsky, Kama is the fourth principle of the septenary, associated with emotions and desires, attachment to existence, volition, and lust.

Kamaloka is a semi-material plane, subjective and invisible to humans, where disembodied "personalities", the astral forms, called Kama-rupa remain until they fade out from it by the complete exhaustion of the effects of the mental impulses that created these eidolons of human and animal passions and desires. It is associated with Hades of ancient Greeks and the Amenti of the Egyptians, the land of Silent Shadows; a division of the first group of the Trailokya.

See also
Kamashastra
Kama Sutra
Arishadvargas, six enemies
Alcmaeon (mythology)
Buddhist cosmology of the Theravada school
Cupid
Hinduism and LGBT topics
Kaam, a word with a similar meaning

References

Sources
 Ireland, John D. (trans.) (1983). Dhammika Sutta: Dhammika (excerpt) (Sn 2.14). Retrieved 5 Jul 2007 from "Access to Insight" at Dhammika Sutta: Dhammika.
 Khantipalo, Bhikkhu (1982, 1995). Lay Buddhist Practice: The Shrine Room, Uposatha Day, Rains Residence (The Wheel No. 206/207). Kandy: Buddhist Publication Society. Retrieved 5 Jul 2007 from "Access to Insight" at http://www.accesstoinsight.org/lib/authors/khantipalo/wheel206.html.
 Sri Lanka Buddha Jayanti Tipitaka Series (n.d.) (SLTP).  (AN 5.1.3.8, in Pali). Retrieved 3 Jul 2007 from "MettaNet-Lanka" at 5:3 Pancangikavaggo - Pali.
 Thanissaro Bhikkhu (trans.) (1997a). Dvedhavitakka Sutta: Two Sorts of Thinking (MN 19). Retrieved 3 Jul 2007 from "Access to Insight" at Dvedhavitakka Sutta: Two Sorts of Thinking.
 Thanissaro Bhikkhu (trans.) (1997b). Samadhanga Sutta: The Factors of Concentration (AN 5.28). Retrieved 3 Jul 2007 from "Access to Insight" at Samadhanga Sutta: The Factors of Concentration.
 H. P. Blavatsky, 1892. The Theosophical Glossary. London: The Theosophical Publishing Society

External links

About.com page
Kamadeva's holy sacrifice

Puruṣārthas
Buddhist philosophical concepts
Theosophical philosophical concepts
Sanskrit words and phrases
Hindu philosophical concepts
Hinduism and sexuality
Pleasure
Happiness
Theories of truth
Tantra
Relational ethics
Hindu ethics